Dyakia is a genus of orchids. It contains only one species, Dyakia hendersoniana (Rchb.f.) Christenson, endemic to the Island of Borneo.

Description
This species is a small to intermediate sized epiphyte.

Generative characteristics
Up to four erect inflorescences are produced axillary. They bear up to 30-40 flowers per inflorescence.

Etymology
The generic name Dyakia is derived from the Dayak people.

Horticulture
This species is rarely cultivated.

References

Orchids of Borneo
Plants described in 1875
Aeridinae
Monotypic angiosperm genera